Leika may refer to:

 Leica Camera AG, a German camera and optics manufacturer
 Lefka, Patras, a neighbourhood in the southern part of the Greek city of Patras
 Leika (Ethiopia), a town in central Ethiopia